Shock Treatment is a 1964 American neo noir drama film directed by Denis Sanders that takes place in a mental institution, starring Stuart Whitman, Carol Lynley, Roddy McDowall, and Lauren Bacall. As one of many films dealing with insane killers in "Psycho's" wake Lauren Bacall disliked the film intensely calling it the worst of her career despite its cult following in later years.

Plot
Martin Ashley, a mentally ill gardener, decapitates his boss, the wealthy Mrs. Townsend, with a pair of garden shears. He subsequently turns himself in to the police, is found insane, and is sent to a mental institution ruled by psychiatrist Edwina Beighley.

Mrs. Townsend's executor, Harley Manning, is suspicious of Ashley and hires actor Dale Nelson to simulate madness and land himself in the same institution; his hope is for Dale to locate a million dollars in stolen loot that Ashley might have hidden. Nelson becomes acquainted with Cynthia Albright, a patient in the hospital, and develops a personal interest in her.

Dr. Beighley uses hypnosis on Ashley and learns of a million dollars he supposedly has buried. She is desperate for money to continue her work. She also comes to realize that Dale is not who or what he seems to be. She orders an electroconvulsive therapy treatment on him as a means of torture, and then confronts him with her suspicions after he regains consciousness. He denies her accusations and threatens to blackmail her for administering the treatment. She responds to his threat by injecting him with drugs that leave him in states of catatonia.

Late one night, Martin and Dr. Beighley are discovered digging a hole near the old Townsend estate. In the box Ashley has buried is nothing but the ashes of money he has burned. Martin snaps at Dr. Beighley, who is angry with him over the burnt funds, and he attacks her; however, Dale intervenes and stops him from killing her. Dr. Beighley's desperation for the money sends her into a state of delusion, and she is determined to recover the money, believing it to be buried somewhere on the estate. Unable to free herself of the delusion, she succumbs to madness and is herself institutionalized, while Dale and Cynthia are discharged.

Cast
Stuart Whitman as Dale Nelson / Arthur
Carol Lynley as Cynthia Lee Albright
Roddy McDowall as Martin Ashley
Lauren Bacall as Dr. Edwina Beighley
Olive Deering as Mrs. Mellon
Ossie Davis as Capshaw
Donald Buka as Psychologist
Paulene Myers as Dr. Walden
Evadne Baker as Intern
Robert J. Wilke as Technician Mike Newton
Bert Freed as Frank Josephson
Judith De Hart as Matron
Judson Laire as Harley Manning
Simon Scott as Police Desk Sergeant (uncredited)

Reception
According to Fox records, the film needed to earn $2,400,000 in film rentals to break even and made $944,000, meaning it lost money.

See also
Shock Corridor

References

External links
 
 Shock Treatment at TCMDB
 
 

1964 films
1964 drama films
1960s psychological thriller films
American black-and-white films
20th Century Fox films
CinemaScope films
Films set in psychiatric hospitals
Films scored by Jerry Goldsmith
Films based on American novels
Films directed by Denis Sanders
1960s English-language films